Seth Soorajmull Jalan Girls’ College, established in 1954, is  undergraduate women's college in Kolkata, West Bengal, India. It offers only courses in arts and commerce. It is affiliated with the University of Calcutta.

Departments

Arts and Commerce

Bengali
English
Sanskrit
Hindi
History
Geography
Political Science
Philosophy
Economics
Education
Commerce

Accreditation
The college is recognized by the University Grants Commission (UGC). It was accredited by the National Assessment and Accreditation Council (NAAC), and awarded B+ grade, an accreditation that has since then expired.

See also 
List of colleges affiliated to the University of Calcutta
Education in India
Education in West Bengal

References

External links
Seth Soorajmull Jalan Girls’ College

Educational institutions established in 1954
University of Calcutta affiliates
Universities and colleges in Kolkata
Women's universities and colleges in West Bengal
1954 establishments in West Bengal